Graham Bailey (born 22 March 1920) is an English former professional footballer who played league games for Huddersfield Town and for Sheffield United as a defender. He was born in Old Park, Shropshire.

When he signed for the 1949/1950 season at Sheffield United in May 1949 a fee of £12 per week was agreed for the first part of the season.

He was invited back to Sheffield United in 1989 to celebrate the club's centenary at a reunion of past and present players at Bramall Lane.

He celebrated his 100th birthday in March 2020 and in February 2021 was tracked down by the Huddersfield Town Supporters Association and confirmed to be the club's oldest living former player. He was visited by the Club Ambassador Andy Booth on his 101st birthday and presented with a Town shirt with his name on the back. As of June 2022, Bailey was living in East Yorkshire with his wife.

References

External links
 Alan Hodgson – Huddersfield Town F.C. Matchday Programme - 2007-08 season

1920 births
Living people
Association football fullbacks
English centenarians
English Football League players
English footballers
Huddersfield Town A.F.C. players
Men centenarians
Mossley A.F.C. players
People from Dawley
Sheffield United F.C. players